The 2020 Campeonato Alagoano (officially the Campeonato Alagoano Smile 2020 for sponsorship reasons) was the 90th edition of the top football league in Alagoas. It began on 22 January 2020 and ended on 5 August 2020. 

The final was played behind closed doors between CSA and CRB at the Estádio Rei Pelé in Maceió on 5 August 2020. CRB won the match 1–0, securing their 31st title.

First phase
Originally, the team with the lowest number of points would be relegated to Campeonato Alagoano Sub 23–Série  B 2021, however due to the COVID-19 pandemic in Brazil, the relegation in the 2020 season was canceled  by FAF.

Knockout phase

Semi-finals

CSA and CRB qualified for 2021 Copa do Brasil

3rd place final

Final

2021 Copa do Brasil play-off
2020 Campeonato Alagoano third place Murici and 2020 Copa Alagoas champions ASA played a two-legged play-off to determine the third team qualified for the 2021 Copa do Brasil. If tied on aggregate, the penalty shoot-out would be used to determine the winner.

Matches

Murici qualified for 2021 Copa do Brasil

References

2020 in Brazilian football leagues
Campeonato Alagoano
Campeonato Alagoano